Cathy H. Wu is the Edward G. Jefferson Chair and professor and director of the Center for Bioinformatics & Computational Biology (CBCB) at the University of Delaware. She is also the director of the Protein Information Resource (PIR) and the North east Bioinformatics Collaborative Steering Committee, and the adjunct professor at the Georgetown University Medical Center.

Early life and education
Wu is the middle child of the five daughters and a son in her family. She responded with top marks at National Taiwan University and showed a flair for science, logic, and computations. Her father was an aeronautics engineer. She graduated with a BS in Plant Pathology at the National Taiwan University in 1978, a MS in Plant Pathology at Purdue University in 1982 and followed with a  PhD in the same university in 1984. She then received a Postdoc degree in Molecular Biology at the Michigan State University in 1986 and a MS in Computer Science at the University of Texas (UT) at Tyler in 1989.

Career
In 1989, Wu completed her thesis on the use of artificial neural networks to classify proteins, and graduated. Her thesis advisor, George M. Witson III, chairman of the Computer Science Department at UT hired her after she graduated in 1989. She then taught computer science as an assistant professor at the Department of Computer Science in UT Tyler from 1989 to 1994. She also worked as an assistant professor from 1990 to 1994, associate professor from 1994 to 1998, and professor from 1998 to 1999 of the Biomathematics University of Texas Health Center at Tyler. She carried out research at the UT Tyler's health sciences college under epidemiology and biomathematics professor Jerry McClarty. She has conducted bioinformatics research from 1990 and developed several protein classification systems and databases. She also managed large software and database projects leading bioinformatics effort of the Protein Information Resource (PIR) from 1999, and became the PIR Director and the vice president of the National Biomedical Research Foundation, Washington, D.C. from 2001 to 2002. From 2001 until present, she is the professor of the Department of Biochemistry & Molecular Biology and the Director of PIR Georgetown University Medical Center (GUMC). She is also currently the professor at the Department of Oncology and the member of the Lombardi Comprehensive Cancer Center, GUMC from 2002. In 2009, Wu was accepted as the Edward G. Jefferson Chair of Bioinformatics and Computational Biology at the University of Delaware (UD).

Awards granted
2020 - Fellow of the Association for Computing Machinery (ACM) 
July 2012 to June 2017 - 1144726, NSF/DGE, IGERT: Systems Biology of Cells in Engineered Environments (SBE2). Role: Co-PI
September 2011 to August 2015 - 2R01GM080646-06 & 3R01GM80646-07S1, NIH/NIGMS, PRO: A Protein Ontology in Open Biomedical Ontologies. Role: PI
July 2011 to June 2015 - 1062520, NSF/DBI, ABI Development: Integrative Bioinformatics for Knowledge Discovery of PTM Networks. Role: PI
September 2011 to August 2014 - DOE/FOA-0000368, Experimental Systems-Biology Approaches for Clostridia-Based Bioenergy Production. Role: Co-PI
November 2009 to February 2014 - 8P20GM103446, NIH/NIGMS, Delaware INBRE Role: Bioinformatics Core Director
August 2010 to 2013 - 1G08 LM010720-01, NIH/NLM, Linking Text Mining and Data Mining for Biomedical Knowledge Discovery. Role: PI
September 2010 to July 2013 - 1U41HG006104-01, NIH/NHGRI, UniProt: A Centralized Protein Sequence and Function Resource. Role: Co-PI
September 2009 to August 2012 - DBI-0850319, NSF/DBI, Linking Text Mining with Ontology and Systems Biology. Role: PI
June 2011 to May 2012 - 1137427, NSF/IIS, III: Small: Women in Bioinformatics Initiative at ACM BCB 2011. Role: Co-PI
September 2009 to April 2012 - 3R01GM080646-04S2, NIH/NIGMS, Pro: A Protein Ontology in Open Biomedical Ontologies. Role: PI

Books and publications

Books
Bioinformatics for Comparative Proteomics (Methods in Molecular Biology), November 19, 2010, by Cathy H. Wu (Editor), Chuming Chen (Editor), 
Computational Biology and Genome Informatics, February 2003, by Cathy H. Wu (Author), Paul P. Wang (Author), Jason T. L. Wang (Editor), 
Neural Networks and Genome Informatics, Volume 1 (Methods in Computational Biology and Biochemistry), October 5, 2000, by C.H. Wu (Editor), J.W. McLarty (Editor),

Publications
UniProt: a hub for protein information. UniProt Consortium. Nucleic Acids Res. Jan 28;43 (Database issue) (2015)

References

External links
Protein Information Resource
Center For Bioinformatics and Computational Biology, University of Delaware

Living people
University of Delaware faculty
Taiwanese women scientists
American women computer scientists
American computer scientists
Women molecular biologists
20th-century American women scientists
21st-century American women scientists
20th-century Taiwanese scientists
20th-century Taiwanese women
21st-century Taiwanese scientists
21st-century Taiwanese women
Year of birth missing (living people)
American women academics